An election was held on November 2, 2010 to elect all 120 members to North Carolina's House of Representatives. The election coincided with elections for other offices, including U.S. House of Representatives, and state senate. The primary election was held on May 4, 2010 with a primary run-off held on June 22, 2010.

Results summary

Incumbents defeated in primary election
Nick Mackey (D-District 99), defeated by Rodney W. Moore (D)
Pearl Burris-Floyd (R-District 110), defeated by Kelly Hastings (R)

Incumbents defeated in general election
Alice Graham Underhill (D-District 3), defeated by Norman Sanderson (R)
Arthur Williams (D-District 6), defeated by Bill Cook (R)
Van Braxton (D-District 10), defeated by Stephen LaRoque (R)
Randy Stewart (D-District 25), defeated by Jeff Collins (R)
Chris Heagarty (D-District 41), defeated by Tom Murry (R)
Douglas Yongue (D-District 46), defeated by Gaston (G. L.) Pridgen (R)
John May (D-District 49), defeated by Glen Bradley (R)
Jimmy L. Love Sr. (D-District 51), defeated by Mike Stone (R)
Nelson Cole (D-District 65), defeated by Bert Jones (I)
Lorene Coates (D-District 77), defeated  by Harry Warren (R)
Hugh Holliman (D-District 81), defeated by Rayne Brown (R)
Cullie Tarleton (D-District 93), defeated by Jonathan Jordan (R)
Jane Whilden (D-District 116), defeated by Tim Moffitt (R)

Open seats that changed parties
Russell Tucker (D-District 4) didn't seek re-election, seat won by Jimmy Dixon (R)
Ray Warren (D-District 88) didn't seek re-election, seat won by Mark Hollo (R)
Bob England (D-District 112) didn't seek re-election, seat won by Mike Hager (R)

Detailed Results

Districts 1-19

District 1 
Incumbent Democrat Bill Owens has represented the 1st District since 1995.

District 2 
Incumbent Democrat Timothy Spear has represented the 2nd district since 2006.

District 3 
Incumbent Democrat Alice Graham Underhill has represented the 3rd district since 2005. Underhill was defeated for re-election by Republican Norman Sanderson.

District 4 
Incumbent Democrat Russell Tucker has represented the 4th district since 2005. Tucker didn't seek re-election and Republican Jimmy Dixon won the open seat.

District 5 
Incumbent Democrat Annie Mobley has represented the 5th district since 2007.

District 6 
Incumbent Democrat Arthur Williams has represented the 6th district since 2003.  He was defeated for re-election by Republican Bill Cook.

District 7 
Incumbent Democrat Angela Bryant has represented the 7th district since 2007.

District 8 
Incumbent Democrat Edith Warren has represented the 8th district and its predecessors since 1999.

District 9 
Incumbent Democrat Marian McLawhorn has represented the 9th district since 1999.

District 10 
Incumbent Democrat Van Braxton has represented the 10th district since 2007. Braxton was defeated for re-election by Republican Stephen LaRoque, who himself had represented this district from 2003 to 2007.

District 11 
Incumbent Republican Efton Sager has represented the 11th district since 2009.

District 12 
Incumbent Democrat William Wainwright has represented the 12th district and its predecessors since 1991.

District 13 
Incumbent Republican Pat McElraft has represented the 13th district since 2007.

District 14 
Incumbent Republican George Cleveland has represented the 14th district since 2005.

District 15 
Incumbent Republican Robert Grady has represented the 15th district and its predecessors since 1987. Grady didn't seek re-election and Republican Phil Shepard won the open seat.

District 16 
Incumbent Republican Carolyn Justice has represented the 16th district since 2003.

District 17 
Incumbent Republican Frank Iler has represented the 17th district since 2009.

District 18 
Incumbent Democrat Sandra Hughes has represented the 18th district since 2008. Hughes didn't seek re-election and Democrat Susi Hamilton won the open seat.

District 19 
Incumbent Republican Danny McComas has represented the 19th district and its predecessors since 1995.

Districts 20-39

District 20 
Incumbent Democrat Dewey Hill has represented the 20th district and its predecessors since 1992.

District 21 
Incumbent Democrat Larry Bell has represented the 21st district since 2001.

District 22 
Incumbent Democrat William Brisson has represented the 22nd district since 2007.

District 23 
Incumbent Democrat Joe Tolson has represented the 23rd district and its predecessors since 1997.

District 24 
Incumbent Democrat Jean Farmer-Butterfield has represented the 24th district since 2003.

District 25 
Incumbent Democrat Randy Stewart has represented the 25th district since 2009. Stewart was defeated for re-election by Republican Jeff Collins.

District 26 
Incumbent Republican Leo Daughtry has represented the 26th district and its predecessors since 1993.

District 27 
Incumbent Democrat Michael Wray has represented the 27th district since 2005.

District 28 
Incumbent Republican James Langdon Jr. has represented the 28th district since 2005.

District 29 
Incumbent Democrat Larry Hall has represented the 29th district since 2006.

District 30 
Incumbent Democrat Paul Luebke has represented the 30th district and its predecessors since 1991.

District 31 
Incumbent Democrat Mickey Michaux has represented the 31st district and its predecessors since 1983.

District 32 
Incumbent Democrat Jim Crawford has represented the 32nd district and its predecessors since 1995.

District 33 
Incumbent Democrat Rosa Gill has represented the 33rd district since 2009.

District 34 
Incumbent Democrat Grier Martin has represented the 34th district since 2005.

District 35 
Incumbent Democrat Jennifer Weiss has represented the 35th district and its predecessors since 1999.

District 36 
Incumbent Republican Nelson Dollar has represented the 36th district since 2005.

District 37 
Incumbent Republican Minority Leader Paul Stam has represented the 37th district since 2003.

District 38 
Incumbent Democrat Deborah Ross has represented the 38th district since 2003.

District 39 
Incumbent Democrat Darren Jackson has represented the 39th district since his appointment in January 2009. Jackson was elected to his first full term.

Districts 40-59

District 40 
Incumbent Republican Marilyn Avila has represented the 40th district since 2007.

District 41 
Incumbent Republican Chris Heagarty has represented the 41st district since his appointment in October 2009. Heagarty sought election to a full term, but he was defeated by Republican Tom Murry.

District 42 
Incumbent Democrat Marvin Lucas has represented the 42nd district and its predecessors since 2001.

District 43 
Incumbent Democrat Elmer Floyd has represented the 43rd district since 2009.

District 44 
Incumbent Democrat Diane Parfitt has represented the 44th district since her appointment in 2010. Parfitt was elected to a full term.

District 45 
Incumbent Democrat Rick Glazier has represented the 45th district since 2003.

District 46 
Incumbent Democrat Douglas Yongue has represented the 46th district and its predecessors since 1994. Republican Gaston (G.L.) Pridgen

District 47 
Incumbent Democrat Ronnie Sutton has represented the 47th district since 1995. Sutton didn't seek re-election and Democrat Charles Graham won the open seat.

District 48 
Incumbent Democrat Garland Pierce has represented the 48th district since 2005.

District 49 
Incumbent Democrat John May has represented the 49th district since his appointment in April 2010. May sought election to a full term, but he was defeated by Republican Glen Bradley.

District 50 
Incumbent Democrat Bill Faison has represented the 50th district since 2005.

District 51 
Incumbent Democrat Jimmy L. Love, Sr. has represented the 51st district since 2006.  Love was defeated for re-election by Republican Mike Stone.

District 52 
Incumbent Republican Jamie Boles has represented the 52nd district since 2009.

District 53 
Incumbent Republican David Lewis has represented the 53rd district since 2003.

District 54 
Incumbent Democrat Speaker of the House Joe Hackney has represented the 54th district and its predecessors since 1981.

District 55 
Incumbent Democrat Winkie Wilkins has represented the 55th district since 2005.

District 56 
Incumbent Democrat Verla Insko has represented the 56th district and its predecessors since 1997.

District 57 
Incumbent Democrat Pricey Harrison has represented the 57th district since 2005.

District 58 
Incumbent Democrat Alma Adams has represented the 58th district and its predecessors since 1994.

District 59 
Incumbent Democrat Maggie Jeffus has represented the 59th district since 1991.

Districts 60-79

District 60 
Incumbent Democrat Earl Jones has represented the 60th district since 2003. Jones didn't seek re-election and Democrat Marcus Brandon won the open seat.

District 61 
Incumbent Republican Laura Wiley has represented the 61st District since 2005. Wiley didn't seek re-election and Republican John Faircloth won the open seat.

District 62 
Incumbent Republican John Blust has represented the 62nd District and its predecessors since 2001.

District 63 
Incumbent Democrat Alice Bordsen has represented the 63rd District since 2003.

District 64 
Incumbent Republican Dan Ingle has represented the 64th District since 2009.

District 65 
Incumbent Democrat Nelson Cole has represented the 65th District since 1993.  Cole was defeated for re-election by conservative independent Bert Jones. Jones chose to caucus with the Republican Party.

District 66 
Incumbent Democrat Melanie Wade Goodwin has represented the 66th District since 2005.  Goodwin didn't seek re-election and Democrat Ken Goodman won the open seat.

District 67 
Incumbent Republican Justin Burr has represented the 67th District since 2009.

District 68 
Incumbent Republican Curtis Blackwood has represented the 68th District since 2003. Blackwood didn't seek re-election and Republican Craig Horn won the open seat.

District 69 
Incumbent Democrat Pryor Gibson has represented the 69th district and its predecessors since 1999.

District 70 
Incumbent Republican Pat Hurley has represented the 70th District since 2007.

District 71 
Incumbent Democrat Larry Womble has represented the 71st District and its predecessors since 1995.

District 72 
Incumbent Democrat Earline Parmon has represented the 72nd District since 2003.

District 73 
Incumbent Republican Larry Brown has represented the 73rd district since 2005.

District 74 
Incumbent Republican Dale Folwell has represented the 74th District since 2005.

District 75 
Incumbent Republican William McGee has represented the 75th District and its predecessors since 1990.

District 76 
Incumbent Republican Fred Steen II has represented the 76th District since 2004.

District 77 
Incumbent Democrat Lorene Coates has represented the 77th District and its predecessors since 2001. Coates was defeated for re-election by Republican Harry Warren.

District 78 
Incumbent Republican Harold Brubaker has represented the 78th District and its predecessors since 1977.

District 79 
Incumbent Republican Julia Craven Howard has represented the 79th District and its predecessors since 1989.

Districts 80-99

District 80 
Incumbent Republican Jerry Dockham has represented the 80th district and its predecessors since 1991.

District 81 
Incumbent Democrat Hugh Holliman has represented the 81st District since 2001. He was defeated for re-election by Republican Rayne Brown.

District 82 
Incumbent Republican Jeff Barnhart has represented the 82nd District since 2001.

District 83 
Incumbent Republican Linda Johnson has represented the 83rd District and its predecessors since 2001.

District 84 
Incumbent Republican Phillip Frye has represented the 84th district since 2003.

District 85 
Incumbent Republican Mitch Gillespie has represented the 85th District since 1999.

District 86 
Incumbent Republican Hugh Blackwell has represented the 86th District since 2009.

District 87 
Incumbent Republican Edgar Starnes has represented the 87th District and its predecessors since 1997.

District 88 
Incumbent Democrat Ray Warren has represented the 88th district since 2007. Warren didn't seek re-election and former Republican representative Mark Hollo won the open seat.

District 89 
Incumbent Republican Mitchell Setzer has represented the 89th District and its predecessors since 1999.

District 90 
Incumbent Republican Sarah Stevens has represented the 90th District since 2009.

District 91 
Incumbent Republican Bryan Holloway has represented the 91st District since 2005.

District 92 
Incumbent Republican Darrell McCormick has represented the 92nd district since 2009.

District 93 
Incumbent Democrat Cullie Tarleton has represented the 93rd district since 2007. He was defeated for re-election by Republican Jonathan Jordan.

District 94 
Incumbent Republican Shirley Randleman has represented the 94th District since 2009.

District 95 
Incumbent Republican Grey Mills has represented the 95th District since 2009.

District 96 
Incumbent Republican Mark Hilton has represented the 96th District and its predecessors since 2001.

District 97 
Incumbent Republican Johnthan Rhyne has represented the 97th District since 2009.

District 98 
Incumbent Republican Thom Tillis has represented the 98th District since 2007.

District 99 
Incumbent Democrat Nick Mackey has represented the 99th District since 2009. Mackey lost re-nomination to fellow Democrat Rodney Moore. Moore Won the general election.

Districts 100-120

District 100 
Incumbent Democrat Tricia Cotham has represented the 100th District since 2007.

District 101 
Incumbent Democrat Beverly Earle has represented the 101st District and its predecessors since 1995.

District 102 
Incumbent Democrat Becky Carney has represented the 102nd District since 2003.

District 103 
Incumbent Republican Jim Gulley has represented the 103rd District and its predecessors since 1997.  Gulley didn't seek re-election and Republican Bill Brawley won the open seat.

District 104 
Incumbent Republican Ruth Samuelson has represented the 104th District since 2007.

District 105 
Incumbent Republican Ric Killian has represented the 105th District since 2006.

District 106 
Incumbent Democrat Martha Alexander has represented the 106th district and its predecessors since 1999.

District 107 
Incumbent Democrat Kelly Alexander has represented the 107th District since 2009.

District 108 
Incumbent Republican Wil Neumann has represented the 108th District since 2007. Neumann didn't seek re-election and Republican John Torbett won the open seat.

District 109 
Incumbent Republican William Current has represented the 109th District since 2005.

District 110 
Incumbent Republican Pearl Burris-Floyd has represented the 110th District since 2009. Burris-Floyd lost re-nomination to fellow Republican Kelly Hastings. Hastings won the general election.

District 111 
Incumbent Republican Tim Moore has represented the 111th District since 2003.

District 112 
Incumbent Democrat Bob England has represented the 112th District since 2003. England didn't seek re-election and Republican Mike Hager won the open seat.

District 113 
Incumbent Republican David Guice has represented the 113th District since 2009.

District 114 
Incumbent Democrat Susan Fisher has represented the 114th District since 2004.

District 115 
Incumbent Democrat Patsy Keever has represented the 115th District since 2010.

District 116 
Incumbent Democrat Jane Whilden has represented the 116th district since 2009. Whilden was defeated for re-election by Republican Tim Moffitt.

District 117 
Incumbent Republican Carolyn Justus has represented the 117th District since October 2002. Justus didn't seek re-election and Republican Chuck McGrady won the open seat.

District 118 
Incumbent Democrat Ray Rapp has represented the 118th District since 2003.

District 119 
Incumbent Democrat Phil Haire has represented the 119th District and its predecessors since 1999.

District 120 
Incumbent Republican Roger West has represented the 120th District and its predecessors since 2000.

Notes

References

North Carolina House of Representatives
House of Representatives
2010